The Scorpio Letters is a 1964 thriller novel by the British writer Victor Canning. Following this stand-alone novel he began his Rex Carver series with The Whip Hand the following year.

Synopsis
George Constantine is a friend of a professor being targeted by a blackmail ring, which is similarly threatening three other prominent British figures - a politician, a businessman and an actress. Joining forces with the actress' daughter, Constantine sets out to tackle the gang behind the operation, a mission that takes them across France and Switzerland.

Adaptation
In 1967 it was adapted into a film of the same title produced by MGM Television, which aired on American television but was also given a cinematic release in several countries. Directed by Richard Thorpe it starred Alex Cord, Shirley Eaton and Laurence Naismith.

References

Bibliography
 Goble, Alan. The Complete Index to Literary Sources in Film. Walter de Gruyter, 1999.
 Reilly, John M. Twentieth Century Crime & Mystery Writers. Springer, 2015.

1964 British novels
British thriller novels
Novels set in London
Novels set in Paris
Novels set in Switzerland
British novels adapted into films
Novels by Victor Canning
Heinemann (publisher) books